Protictis ("first weasel") is an extinct paraphyletic genus of placental mammals from extinct subfamily Didymictinae within extinct family Viverravidae, that lived in North America from early Paleocene to middle Eocene.

Etymology
The name of genus Protictis comes  and Latin ictis.

Description
Protictis was a mongoose-like animal that was lightly built. The species had variable sizes. Parts of the skeleton of P. haydenianus are known and this species was about 75 cm long, comparable to the related Didymictis and the modern day Asian civets. The skull of P. simpsoni shows that this species was larger than P. haydenianus. P. minor on the other hand was smaller than P. haydenianus. The morphology of the limb bones of P haydenianus points at a scansorial lifestyle. Protictis had two times as many teeth as modern carnivores. The characteristic carnassials of carnivores were already clearly developed in Protictis, but the long and pointy teeth show that insects were still a major component of this diet. Endocasts of the skull shows that both vision and hearing were important senses, but the position of the eye sockets shows that threedimensional vision was not as well developed as in modern carnivores.

Classification and phylogeny

History of classification
Fossils of Protictis are found in the United States and Canada and date mainly from the early to late Paleocene. The holotype of first discovered species (a part of the upper and lowe jaw) were described in 1882 by Edward Drinker Cope based on finds in the San Juan Basin in New Mexico and classified as Didymictis haydenianus. William Diller Matthew described Protictis as a subgenus of Didymictis in 1937 and in 1966 MacIntyre classified it as a separate genus.

Taxonomy

Phylogeny
The phylogenetic relationships of genus Protictis are shown in the following cladogram:

See also
 Mammal classification
 Didymictinae

References

Viverravids
Paleocene mammals of North America
Prehistoric placental genera